My Comedy Album is the debut album by comedian Chris Gethard. The album was released on April 22, 2014 by Don Giovanni Records.

Track listing
Alan Rickman 11:17
Lesbian Girlfriend 1:09
I Survived (This Is A Joke About Advertising) 7:13
J Crew vs. Punk Rock 2:58
The Animal Game 2:40
Mother's Day 2:36
Bonnaroo 9:52
Conclusion 1:06
Crying at the Wawa (feat. Mal Blum) 5:11

Reception

The A.V. Club named the album one of the best comedy albums of 2014. It also received a 9.2/10 from Paste Magazine

References

2014 albums
Don Giovanni Records albums
2010s comedy albums
2010s spoken word albums
Spoken word albums by American artists
Live spoken word albums
Chris Gethard albums